Humansdorp is a small town and surrounding district in the Eastern Cape of South Africa, with a population of around 29,000 during the census of 2011. It is part of the Kouga Local Municipality of the Sarah Baartman District.

The town is the centre of the district's light industry and farming. Humansdorp was founded in 1849, and was named after Johannes Jurie Human and Matthys Gerhardus Human, who were joint founders of the Dutch Reformed Church congregation there. The town's residential streets are lined with trees that were planted before the First World War by then-mayor Ambrose Saffery.

The Apple Express passes through Humansdorp.

Notable residents 

 Heinrich Schörbeck (alias Hendrik Spoorbek/Skoorbek), seer and magician
 Cornelia Bürki, Olympic athlete
 Sergeal Petersen, rugby union player
 Ricardo Groenewald, musician
 Manie Libbok, rugby union player

References

External links 

 Kouga Municipality
 

Populated places in the Kouga Local Municipality
1849 establishments in the Cape Colony